Macaura v Northern Assurance Co Ltd [1925] AC 619 appeared before the House of Lords concerning the principle of lifting the corporate veil. Unusually, the request to do so was in this case made by the corporation's owner.

Facts
Mr Macaura owned the Killymoon estate in County Tyrone, Northern Ireland. He sold the timber there to Irish Canadian Sawmills Ltd for 42,000 fully paid up £1 shares, making him the whole owner (with nominees). Mr Macaura was also an unsecured creditor for £19,000. He got insurance policies - but in his own name, not the company's - with Northern Assurance covering for fire. Two weeks later, there was a fire. Northern Assurance refused to pay up because the timber was owned by the company, and that because the company was a separate legal entity, it did not need to pay Mr Macaura any money.

Judgment
The House of Lords held insurers were not liable on the contract, since the timber that perished in the fire did not belong to Mr Macaura, who held the insurance policy. Lord Buckmaster gave the first judgment, holding in favour of the insurance companies. Lord Atkinson concurred. Lord Sumner concurred and said the following.

Lord Wrenbury and Phillimore concurred.

See also

Kosmopoulos v Constitution Insurance Co of Canada [1987] 1 SCR 2
Attorney General of Belize v Belize Telecom Ltd
Lee v Lee’s Air Farming [1961] AC 12

Notes

English tort case law
United Kingdom company case law
House of Lords cases
United Kingdom corporate personality case law
1925 in case law
1925 in British law